Christos Tsigiridis (pronounced ; 1877 - 1947) was a Greek electrical engineer and technological pioneer of his era. He was the first who imported the technology of sound reinforcement systems to Greece and led the installation of the first sound system in the Greek Parliament. He is mainly known for setting up the first radio station in Greece and the wider Balkans in the city of Thessaloniki.

Birth and first years
Christos Tsigiridis was born in 1877 in Filibe in the Ottoman Empire (today Plovdiv, Bulgaria) by Greek parents. The once wealthy and aristocratic family of Georgios Tsigiridis had a hard time, which worsened after his death. At the start of the 20th century they were forced to leave and move to Stuttgart in Germany. There, they founded a small cigarette production unit which brought enough money to allow Christos to study. Finally, he was able to study in the electrical mechanisms faculty of Stuttgart. A few years later, he was married to Maria Louise Vogel and they moved to Greece together in 1918. They would remain together until her death in 1933.

After moving to Greece, he settled in Larissa, in the house of his brother, Nikos. There, he was appointed director of the city's Electric Lighting and Water Supply Company. However, he was more interested in pursuing the experiments with wireless communication he had first seen in the university. Therefore, he decided to move to Thessaloniki, aiming to fulfill his vision: to found a radio station.

The loud speaker, or "big speechmaker"
The first tests on radio transmission were carried out in his home, in Thessaloniki. In 1926 the 1st Thessaloniki International Fair was held in the area in front of the 3rd Army Corps premises. Tsigiridis' home was almost across the street, in the former Dimokratias street (nowadays called Vassilissis Olgas).

During the Fair, Tsigiridis sold loudspeakers and sound amplifiers as an agent of the German Siemens & Halske company. It should be mentioned that the devices were completely unknown in Greece, at that time: his sound reinforcement systems and his loudspeakers in specific were described as "noisy instruments" and caused awe and marvel to people. Most impressive of all was a radio receiver which he installed in the central square of the Exhibition.

His loudspeakers played spots about the exhibitors and music. The term "loudspeaker" was non-existent at that time in the Greek language. Thus, he improvised a quick direct translation of the English term, which today sounds something like "the big speechmaker" (μέγας λέκτης).

The radio station
In 1926, Christos Tsigiridis set up his transmitter of approximately 400 Watt power in the premises of the International Trade Fair. The first radio station of Greece, the Balkans and South-Eastern Europe in general was finally realized. The transmissions began on 25 March 1926, with initially only two listeners, one around Ippodromiou square, and the other in an English ship in Thessaloniki harbour. The high cost of a radio receiver at the time meant that few could afford them; nevertheless, the receivers multiplied soon.

A strict law on radio transmissions had been already passed, and therefore Tsigiridis was forced to operate the transmitter only during the International Trade Fair in September. He kept applying for a long-term broadcasting license, but it was not granted to him for several years.

Tsigiridis operated the transmitter on his own expense, based on income from advertisements. His "station" hosted several artists. The gramophone had just incorporated the electric signal, and since records were rare and Greek record collections even rarer, the musical program consisted of live performances by singers and musicians, in the studio. The most important employees of Tsigiridis in the 1930s were M. Ghrosomanidis, Nikos Karmiris, A. Stratidis, Traianou, K. Tsantsanoglou and others.

At the outbreak of World War II, Tsigiridis used his radio station to interfere with broadcasts from the Italian radio station of Bari, which carried out propaganda broadcasts to Greece. It was also Tsigiridis' station that broadcast the news of the Italian invasion to Thessaloniki, since the Athens radio signal could not reach Northern Greece.

German occupation
With the beginning of the German occupation, the transmitter was confiscated and Tsigiridis was forced to technically support German-supervised transmissions. Since he was the only one able to operate the equipment, he kept causing trouble to the German transmissions by regularly suspending them for "essential repairs", as he claimed. The Germans imprisoned him, believing they would be able to operate the transmitter by themselves, but it soon proved to be impossible. So they released Tsigiridis the following day in order to operate the station again. Soon they hired a German mechanic to work with Tsigiridis, so as to be instructed on how to operate the transmitter, while they wrote down every move of Tsigiridis. Tsigiridis, being suspicious of the situation, made irrelevant connections all the time and the Germans were never able to operate the transmitter by themselves. Finally, they had to install a radio transmitter of 20 kW of their own.

During the occupation, the receivers were sealed by the occupiers, and thus Tsigiridis used to tune in BBC in his own receiver (which was left intact by the Germans, in order to be able to relay German stations) and spread the news by word-of-mouth, whenever he got to the cafe. Some time he was almost caught while illegally listening to the BBC, but he instantly set the radio dial on a German radio frequency without being noticed.

The last years
After the liberation of Greece in October 1944, the transmitter was bought by Markos Vafiadis and operated on behalf of the EAM during the Dekemvriana. In 1945 it was returned to its constructor who started broadcasting again. For approximately one year, the transmitter got a temporary license for continuous transmission.

In 1947 the radio station was bought by the National Radio Institution (EIR), which had started broadcasting in Athens in 1938. Tsigiridis' equipment was turned off and a brand-new, more powerful transmitter was installed at the same place. The studios were established at the "House of the Soldier", next to the then-military theatre.

Tsigiridis was suddenly idle, since he had no equipment any more and the state broadcasting authority
decided not to use him in its new facilities. He finally died the same year.

External Articles and References

References
 Thessaloniki Radio Museum
 Athina 9.84 Radio Museum

Further reading
 Plechova, Olga: The first Greek radio... and the first of Balkans, Barbounakis publications 2002, 
 Tyrovouzis, Nestoras: "Macedonia" newspaper and "Radio tsigiridis", University Studio Press 2005, 

1877 births
1947 deaths
Scientists from Plovdiv
Greek electrical engineers
History of radio
Radio pioneers
Emigrants from the Ottoman Empire to Greece
Expatriates from the Ottoman Empire in Germany